Andrew Lewis (born September 10, 1974) is a retired American soccer defender who played professionally in Major League Soccer.

In 1993, Lewis graduated from the Pingry School.  He then played college soccer at Princeton University from 1993 to 1995.  He was a 1994 Third Team All American.

In February 1997, the MetroStars selected Lewis in third round (twenty-fifth overall) of the 1997 MLS College Draft.  He played nineteen games for the MetroStars.  On November 6, 1997, the Chicago Fire selected Lewis with the seventeenth pick of the 1997 MLS Expansion Draft.  He spent four injury marred seasons in Chicago, where he was known as "The Bull", before being released on January 15, 2002.  On March 22, 2002, he signed with the Charleston Battery of the USL A-League.  In 2004, he played for the Atlanta Silverbacks.

References

External links
 MetroStar profile
 Charleston Battery player profile

1974 births
Living people
American soccer players
Atlanta Silverbacks players
Charleston Battery players
Chicago Fire FC players
Major League Soccer players
MLS Pro-40 players
New York Red Bulls players
Princeton Tigers men's soccer players
Parade High School All-Americans (boys' soccer)
A-League (1995–2004) players
People from New Providence, New Jersey
Soccer players from New Jersey
Sportspeople from Union County, New Jersey
New York Red Bulls draft picks
Association football defenders